The Dirty Dozen is a one-day road cycling race in Pittsburgh, Pennsylvania, held annually on the Saturday before the Halloween holiday in October. The event is contested over a  course that features 13 of the steepest hills in the Pittsburgh metropolitan area.

History

The Dirty Dozen was founded in 1983 by brothers Tom and Danny Chew and their friend Bob Gottlieb, in an attempt to find and ride the steepest hills in Pittsburgh. Five riders participated in the first edition, though only three finished. The race has been held every year since 1983—except 1993 and 2020. In 1984, the Dirty Dozen was contested twice: once in January and once in October. 

The 2016 edition of the race was the first in which co-founder and promoter Danny Chew did not participate. He broke his neck in a cycling crash in September 2016 and suffered permanent paralysis. Chew provided live commentary during the race via videolink, and the event itself served as a fundraiser for Chew's ongoing care and rehabilitation.

Format

Competitors ride between hills at a neutral pace, and a whistle signals the rolling start of each hill. The top male and female riders on each hill score points, with the first place male rider scoring 10 points and the tenth place receiving 1 point. Only the first five women score points, although the men and women ride together. The final standings are established by cumulative points throughout the event. In order to qualify as a finisher, riders must complete each hill in the event without losing forward progress or dismounting from the bicycle. If a rider fails to maintain forward progress, he or she must descend to the bottom of the hill and ride to the top under their own power.

Route

The original Dirty Dozen route included 12 climbs, and there have been as many as 15, but since 1988 the race has typically featured the same baker's dozen of 13 hills. The course begins at the Bud Harris Cycling Track in Highland Park and finishes at the top of Tesla Street in Hazelwood, crossing 87 intersections in the city and nearby suburbs. 2016's version substituted Lawrenceville's Christopher Street for a seasonally closed Berryhill Rd.

Hills

 Center Ave./Guyasuta Rd. in Aspinwall
 Ravine St./Sharps Hill in Sharpsburg
 Berryhill Rd. between Saxonburg Blvd. and Middle Rd. in O'Hara
 High St./Seavy Rd. in Etna
 Logan St. in Millvale
 Rialto St. across from the 31st Street Bridge
 Suffolk/Hazleton/Burgess streets on North Side
 Sycamore St. on Mt. Washington
 Canton Ave. in Beechview
 Boustead St. in Beechview
 Welsh Way on the South Side
 Barry/Holt/Eleanor streets on the South Side
 Flowers Ave./Tesla St. in Hazelwood

References

External links
"The Dirty Dozen"Official event website
"Riding Pittsburgh's Dirty Dozen"from Bicycle Times Magazine
"The Dirty Dozen: A Stupendous Bike Ride" from WQED (YouTube link)

Cycle races in the United States
Sports in Pittsburgh
Recurring sporting events established in 1983
1983 establishments in Pennsylvania